Hopevale Union Free School District was a school district covering a single educational institution in Hamburg, New York. Hopevale Inc., a social services agency, maintained a residential and day institution for students in grades 7-12 who had difficulty in mainstream educational environments.

It was affiliated with Erie 1 BOCES.

History
Sisters of Our Lady of Charity created a women's orphan and care facility in Buffalo, New York in 1855. This evolved to Hopevale, Inc. The school occupied its campus in Hamburg in 1971. The New York State Legislature created a "Special Act Public School District" to provide educational services. The school continued to take only girls as boarders, but its day services at Hamburg were co-gender. The final school building was built in 1992. The district retained the older gymnasium facility.

By 2010 the number of students attending Hopevale had declined. In December 2010 Hopevale Inc. announced it was closing. Originally the school was to close effective December 24.

While Hopevale Inc. had closed in December and had ended the boarding program, causing enrollment to drop from 125 to 85, the day school ultimately stayed open for the remainder of the school year and was to be absorbed by Randolph Academy (affiliated with the Randolph Academy Union Free School District), which took over its campus. In 2011 Hopevale UFSD was dissolved on the orders of Governor of New York Andrew Cuomo.

Campus
The Hopevale UFSD school post-1992 had  of space, and the gymnasium had  of space.

Student body
Students typically had short term periods studying at Hopevale, typically a year to a year and two months.

See also
 List of boarding schools in the United States

References

External links
 
 
 

School districts in New York (state)
Education in Erie County, New York
Public middle schools in New York (state)
Public high schools in New York (state)
2011 disestablishments in New York (state)
Public boarding schools in the United States
Boarding schools in New York (state)
School districts disestablished in 2011